Miguel de Paz Plá (born 31 January 1961) is a former field hockey player from Spain, who won the silver medal with the Men's National Team at the 1980 Summer Olympics in Moscow. He competed in three consecutive Summer Olympics for Spain, starting in 1980.

External links
 

Spanish Olympic Committee

1961 births
Living people
Spanish male field hockey players
Olympic field hockey players of Spain
Field hockey players at the 1980 Summer Olympics
Field hockey players at the 1984 Summer Olympics
Field hockey players at the 1988 Summer Olympics
Olympic silver medalists for Spain
Olympic medalists in field hockey
Medalists at the 1980 Summer Olympics
Atlètic Terrassa players